Karisöödi is a village in Rõuge Parish, Võru County, Estonia. Between 1991–2017 (until the administrative reform of Estonian municipalities) the village was located in Mõniste Parish. It is the southernmost settlement in Estonia.

References 

Villages in Võru County
Extreme points of Estonia